The Santuit Post Office is a historic post office building on Main Street in the Santuit village of Barnstable, Massachusetts.  The -story wood-frame cottage was built c. 1846, and exhibits simple Gothic Revival styling reminiscent of seaside cottages that were constructed in the area between 1850 and 1875.  The building served as a post office for Santuit village until the 1970s, when it was converted into a private residence.

The building was listed on the National Register of Historic Places in 1987.

See also 

 National Register of Historic Places listings in Barnstable County, Massachusetts
 List of United States post offices

References 

Post office buildings on the National Register of Historic Places in Massachusetts
Buildings and structures in Barnstable, Massachusetts
National Register of Historic Places in Barnstable, Massachusetts